"There's a Brand New World" is the name of a 1988 single by the British pop group Five Star. Peaking at #61, it was the band's first single since 1985 not to make the UK Top 40. The track was taken from the band's fourth album, Rock the World.

Track listings
7" single:
 There's A Brand New World (7" single remix)
 U

12" single:
 There's A Brand New World (12" version)
 Rescue Me (Instrumental version – though not listed as such)
 U

CD single:
 There's A Brand New World (7" single remix)
 Stay Out of My Life (12" version)
 There's A Brand New World (12" version)
 U

All tracks available on the remastered versions of either the 2012 'Rock The World' album, the 2013 'The Remix Anthology (The Remixes 1984–1991)' or the 2018 'Luxury – The Definitive Anthology 1984-1991' boxset.

Five Star songs
1988 singles
Songs written by Denise Pearson
1988 songs
RCA Records singles